Peter Tiepold (born 15 November 1945 in Berlin) is a former light-middleweight boxer from East Germany.  He was a quarterfinalist at the 1968 Olympic Games and a bronze medallist at the 1972 Olympic Games. He competed for the SC Dynamo Berlin / Sportvereinigung (SV) Dynamo.

1968 Olympic results
Below is the record of Peter Tiepold, an East German light middleweight boxer who competed at the 1968 Mexico City Olympics:

 Round of 64: bye
 Round of 32: defeated Vladimir Kucera (Czechoslovakia) by decision, 5-0
 Round of 16: defeated Jaime Lozano (Mexico) by decision, 5-0
 Quarterfinal: lost to Jerzy Kulej (Poland) by decision, 2-3

References 

sports-reference

1945 births
Middleweight boxers
Boxers at the 1968 Summer Olympics
Boxers at the 1972 Summer Olympics
People from East Berlin
Boxers from Berlin
Olympic boxers of East Germany
Olympic bronze medalists for East Germany
Living people
Olympic medalists in boxing
German male boxers
Medalists at the 1972 Summer Olympics